Arsen Zhorayevich Galstyan (born 19 February 1989) is an Armenian-born Russian judoka. Galstyan is a Merited Master of Sports of Russia and an Olympic Champion at the 2012 Summer Olympics.

Biography
Arsen Galstyan was born on 19 February 1989 in the village of Nerkin Karmiraghbyur in north-east Armenia. His father was a football player, playing for the club Impuls FC Dilijan in the second half of the 1970s and later played as a part of FC Ararat Yerevan. While living in Armenia, Galstyan played the drums in the national ensemble. When he was seven, his family moved to Russia and settled in the stanitsa village of Giaginskaya, Adygea. He studied at the School № 4 of the village and started judo at a local sports club. Galstyan first played volleyball and then football before judo. His brothers, Arman and Tigran, also compete in judo. Igor Romanov was the first coach of Arsen and is still his personal trainer.

Galstyan later moved to Krasnodar, where he currently lives. He worked as a junior inspector of security detention center № 1 FPS in Russia's Krasnodar region. Galstyan was a student in the sports department of the Kabardino-Balkarian State University.

In 2007, he finished third at the Russian National Championship and, in the same year, first represented Russia internationally. He has been a member of the Russian national judo team since 2007. In 2009, he became a European Champion, and in 2010 he won a bronze medal in the World Championship.

Galstyan competed at the 2012 Summer Olympics in the Men's -60 kg division. Galstyan was an underdog and found himself fighting all of the favorites. In the semifinals, he bested Asian Champion Choi Gwang-Hyeon. Galstyan next overcame reigning two-time World Champion Rishod Sobirov, ranked number one by the International Judo Federation, in the semifinals. Finally, Arsen Galstyan and Hiroaki Hiraoka fought in the finals, and Galstyan defeated Hiraoka with an ippon after 41 seconds. Galstyan scored the ippon as he was about to fall victim to an ippon of Hiraoka's. He brought Russia its first gold medal of the Olympic Games. He dedicated his victory to the victims of the flood in the Krasnodar region.

R-Sport News Agency named Galstyan Russia’s second most successful athlete for 2012. He was also ranked in Russia's top ten athletes of 2012 by the Russian Sports Journalists Federation.

Personal life
In December 2010, Galstyan fought, as a sparring partner, against Russian Prime Minister Vladimir Putin, a black belt and former judo champion.

His father was his last football coach. Arsen's two brothers, senior Tigran and junior Arman, are both masters of judo and help Arsen train. Galstyan is not married. As of 2012, Galstyan lives in the city of Krasnodar.

Galstyan visited Armenia after winning his Olympic gold medal and was called a hero by those in his home country, which was the most enjoyable Olympic moment for him. He still considers Armenia to be his home country, along with Russia. Armenian Sports and Youth Affairs Minister Hrachya Rostomyan congratulated Galstyan on his 2012 Olympic victory. Galstyan also urged all foreign Armenian athletes to maintain closer ties with the homeland.

Awards

Honored Master of Sports of Russia (March 26, 2012)
Order of Friendship (13 August 2012) - for outstanding contribution to the development of physical culture and sports, high achievements in sports at the 2012 Summer Olympics in London, United Kingdom.

References

External links

 
 
 
 
 

1989 births
Living people
People from Nerkin Karmiraghbyur
Russian male judoka
Olympic judoka of Russia
Judoka at the 2012 Summer Olympics
Medalists at the 2012 Summer Olympics
Olympic gold medalists for Russia
Olympic medalists in judo
Russian people of Armenian descent
Universiade medalists in judo
Universiade silver medalists for Russia
Medalists at the 2013 Summer Universiade
Ethnic Armenian sportspeople